Neptis is a large genus of butterflies of Old World tropics subtropics. They are commonly called sailer butterflies or sailers, or more precisely typical sailers to distinguish them from the related blue sailer (Pseudoneptis).

Description

The head is rather broad and moderately hairy on the forehead. The eyes are large and prominent. The palpi are short, acute, slender, hairy, and do not rise above the level of the forehead. The antennae are moderately long, terminating in an elongate, gradually-formed club, flattened on its upper surface. The thorax is not robust and it is as broad as the head and slightly hairy posteriorly. The wing characters are: forewings elongate, rather truncate; costa only slightly arched; apex not acute, but well marked; hind margin slightly convex and sinuated; anal angle distinct; inner-margin convex near base, slightly concave about middle. Hindwings large, rounded; costa strongly arched; hind margin moderately dentate; inner margins only slightly convex, not covering posterior portion of the abdomen. Upperside patterning consists of white spots and bars (some species have orange or yellow bars) on a black ground colour. Underside patterns are yellowish to reddish brown, alternating with white bands The legs are rather short and stout. The abdomen is slender, much compressed and rather elongate.

The head of the larva is very large and bifid on its summit. There is a pair of downy, elongate, tubercular processes, projecting laterally, on both the second and third segments—those on the third segment are much longer. There is an upright pyramidal process on the penultimate segment and the body is attenuated posteriorly.

The pupa is strongly curved (thick in central portion). The head is deeply bifid.

Distribution
About 65 species occur in the Afrotropical realm, over 40 in the Palearctic realm 6 in the Australasian realm and about 50 occur in the Indomalayan realm.

Habitat
Neptis are forest, including rainforest and secondary forest, butterflies. They are also found in lightly wooded areas and gardens.

Biology
Larval food plants come from the families Fabaceae, Rhamnaceae, Euphorbiaceae, Polygonaceae, Sapindaceae, Urticaceae and Connaraceae.

Adults have a "sailing" flight flapping their wings and then gliding. They frequently perch and visit flowers for nectar and damp patches where they imbibe salts and other nutrients. Adult uppersides exhibit disruptive coloration, This species has been observed to make sounds whose function has not been established.

Taxonomy

Neptis are allied to Pantoporia, in which the white wing markings are replaced by orange and to Athyma resemble Neptis but have more triangular forewings. The type species of the genus is Papilio aceris Esper.

Species

Species include:

Neptis agatha Cramer 1782
 Neptis agouale Pierre-Baltus, 1978
 Neptis alta Overlaet, 1955
 Neptis alwina Bremer & Grey, 1853
 Neptis amieti Pierre-Baltus, 2007
 Neptis ananta Moore, 1858 – yellow sailer
 Neptis angusta Condamin, 1966
 Neptis anjana Moore, 1881 – rich sailer
 Neptis antilope Leech, 1892 – variegated sailer
 Neptis arachne Leech, 1890
 Neptis armandia Oberthür, 1876
 Neptis aurivillii Schultze, 1913
 Neptis beroe Leech, 1890
 Neptis biafra Ward, 1871
 Neptis brebissonii Boisduval, 1832
 Neptis camarensis Schultze, 1917
 Neptis carcassoni van Son, 1959 – Carcasson's streaked sailer
 Neptis carlsbergi Collins & Larsen, 2005
 Neptis carpenteri Eltringham, 1922
 Neptis cartica Moore, 1872 – plain sailer
 Neptis celebica Moore, 1899
 Neptis choui Yuan & Wang, 1994
 Neptis clarei Aurivillius, 1912 – Clare's sailer
 Neptis claude Collins & Larsen, 2005
 Neptis clinia Moore, 1872 – clear sailer
 Neptis clinioides de Nicéville, 1894
 Neptis columella Neave, 1904
 Neptis comorarum Oberthür, 1890
 Neptis conspicua Neave, 1904
 Neptis constantiae Carcasson, 1961 – Constance's sailer
 Neptis continuata Holland, 1892
 Neptis cormilloti Turlin, 1994
 Neptis cydippe Leech, 1890 – Chinese yellow sailer
 Neptis cymela C. & R. Felder, 1863
 Neptis decaryi Le Cerf, 1928
 Neptis dejeani Oberthür, 1894
 Neptis dentifera Schultze, 1917
 Neptis divisa Oberthür, 1908
 Neptis dumetorum Boisduval, 1833
 Neptis duryodana Moore, 1858
 Neptis eltringhami Joicey & Talbot, 1926
 Neptis esakii Nomura, 1935
 Neptis exaleuca Karsch, 1894
 Neptis felisimilis Schröder & Treadaway, 1983
 Neptis frobenia (Fabricius, 1798)
 Neptis goochi Trimen, 1879 – (small) streaked sailer
 Neptis gracilis (Kirsch, 1885)
 Neptis gratiosa Overlaet, 1955
 Neptis guia Chou & Wang, 1994
 Neptis harita Moore, 1875 – (Indian) dingiest sailer
 Neptis hesione Leech, 1890
 Neptis hylas (Linnaeus, 1758) – common sailer
 Neptis ida Moore, 1858
 Neptis ilira Kheil, 1884
 Neptis incongrua Butler, 1896
 Neptis infusa Birket-Smith, 1960
 Neptis ioannis Eliot, 1959
 Neptis jamesoni Godman & Salvin, 1890
 Neptis jordani Neave, 1910 – Jordan's sailer
 Neptis jumbah Moore, 1857 – chestnut-streaked sailer
 Neptis katama Collins & Larsen, 1991
 Neptis kikideli Boisduval, 1833
 Neptis kikuyuensis Jackson, 1951 – Kikuyu sailer
 Neptis kiriakoffi Overlaet, 1955 – Kiriakoff's sailer
 Neptis laeta Overlaet, 1955 – common sailer
 Neptis lamtoensis Pierre-Baltus, 2007
 Neptis larseni Wojtusiak & Pyrcz, 1997
 Neptis latvitta Strand, 1909
 Neptis lermanni Aurivillius, 1896
 Neptis leucoporos Fruhstorfer, 1908
 Neptis liberti Pierre & Pierre-Baltus, 1998
 Neptis livingstonei Suffert, 1904
 Neptis loma Condamin, 1971
 Neptis lugubris Rebel, 1914
 Neptis magadha C. & R. Felder, 1867
 Neptis mahendra Moore, 1872 – Himalayan sailer
 Neptis manasa Moore, 1857 – pale hockeystick sailer
 Neptis marci Collins & Larsen, 1998
 Neptis matilei Pierre-Balthus, 2000
 Neptis mayottensis Oberthür, 1890
 Neptis melicerta (Drury, 1773) – streaked sailer
 Neptis meloria Oberthür, 1906
 Neptis metalla Doubleday & Hewitson
 Neptis metanira Holland, 1892
 Neptis metella Doubleday & Hewitson, 1850
 Neptis miah Moore, 1858
 Neptis mindorana C. & R. Felder, 1863
 Neptis mixophyes Holland, 1892
 Neptis morosa Overlaet, 1955 – morose sailer
 Neptis mpassae Pierre-Baltus, 2007
 Neptis multiscoliata Pierre-Baltus, 2007
 Neptis najo Karsch, 1893
 Neptis namba Tytler, 1915
 Neptis nandina Moore, 1858
 Neptis narayana Moore, 1858 – broadstick sailer
 Neptis nashona Swinhoe, 1896 – less rich sailer
 Neptis nata Moore, 1858 – dirty sailer
 Neptis nausicaa de Nicéville, 1897
 Neptis nebrodes Hewitson, 1874
 Neptis nemetes Hewitson, 1868
 Neptis nemorosa Oberthür, 1906
 Neptis nemorum Oberthür, 1906
 Neptis nicobule Holland, 1892
 Neptis nicomedes Hewitson, 1874
 Neptis nicoteles Hewitson, 1874
 Neptis nigra Pierre-Baltus, 2007
 Neptis nina Staudinger, 1896 – tiny sailer
 Neptis nisaea de Nicéville, 1894
 Neptis nitetis Hewitson, 1868
 Neptis noyala Oberthür, 1906
 Neptis nycteus de Nicéville, 1890 – hockeystick sailer
 Neptis nysiades Hewitson, 1868
 Neptis occidentalis Rothschild, 1918
 Neptis ochracea Neave, 1904
 Neptis omeroda Moore, 1875
 Neptis pampanga C. & R. Felder, 1863
 Neptis paula Staudinger, 1895
 Neptis penningtoni van Son, 1977 – Pennington's sailer
 Neptis philyra Ménétriés, 1858
 Neptis philyroides Staudinger, 1887
 Neptis poultoni Eltringham, 1921
 Neptis praslini (Boisduval, 1832)
 Neptis pryeri Butler, 1871
 Neptis pseudonamba Huang, 2001
 Neptis pseudovikasi (Moore, 1899)
 Neptis puella Aurivillius, 1894
 Neptis quintilla Mabille, 1890
 Neptis radha Moore, 1857 – great yellow sailer
 Neptis reducta Fruhstorfer, 1908
 Neptis rivularis (Scopoli, 1763) – Hungarian glider
 Neptis rogersi Eltringham, 1921 – Roger's sailer
 Neptis rothschildi Eltringham, 1921
 Neptis rosa Pierre-Baltus, 2007
 Neptis saclava Boisduval, 1833 – spotted sailer
 Neptis sangangi Huang, 2001
 Neptis sankara (Kollar, 1844) – broad-banded sailer
 Neptis sappho (Pallas, 1771) – common glider or Pallas' sailer
 Neptis satina Grose-Smith, 1894
 Neptis sedata Sasaki, 1982
 Neptis seeldrayersi Aurivillius, 1895
 Neptis serena Overlaet, 1955 – river sailer
 Neptis sextilla Mabille, 1882
 Neptis sinocartica Chou & Wang, 1994
 Neptis soma Moore, 1858 – sullied sailer
 Neptis speyeri Staudinger, 1887
 Neptis stellata Pierre-Baltus, 2007
 Neptis strigata Aurivillius, 1894
 Neptis sunica Eliot, 1969
 Neptis swynnertoni Trimen, 1912
 Neptis sylvana Oberthür, 1906
 Neptis taiwana Fruhstorfer, 1908
 Neptis theodora Oberthür, 1906
 Neptis thestias Leech, 1892
 Neptis thetis Leech, 1890
 Neptis trigonophora Butler, 1878 – barred sailer
 Neptis troundi Pierre-Baltus, 1978
 Neptis vibusa Semper, 1889
 Neptis vikasi Horsfield, 1829 – dingy sailer
 Neptis vindo Pierre-Baltus, 1978
 Neptis vingerhoedti Pierre-Baltus, 2003
 Neptis viridis Pierre-Baltus, 2007
 Neptis woodwardi Sharpe, 1899 – Woodward's sailer
 Neptis yerburii Butler, 1886 – Yerbury's sailer
 Neptis zaida Westwood, 1850 – pale-green sailer

References

Seitz, A. Die Gross-Schmetterlinge der Erde 13: Die Afrikanischen Tagfalter. Plate XIII 48

External links
Images representing Neptis at EOL
Neptis full species list at Swedish Wikipedia

 
Nymphalidae genera
Taxa named by Johan Christian Fabricius
Limenitidinae